is a railway station in Toyama, Toyama Prefecture, Japan, operated by West Japan Railway Company (JR West). It is the largest and busiest railway terminal in Toyama.

, the local railway terminal that provides access to nearby towns (Funahashi, Kamiichi, Tateyama, etc.) as well as access to Tateyama Station (the starting point of the Tateyama Kurobe Alpine Route) via  Toyama Chihō Railway is next to JR Toyama Station.

Lines
Toyama Station is served by the following lines.
JR West
Hokuriku Shinkansen
Takayama Main Line
Ainokaze Toyama Railway
Ainokaze Toyama Railway Line
Toyama Chihō Railway
Toyama City Tram Line (Toyama-Ekimae Station)
Toyama-Kō Line (Toyamaeki-Kita Station)

Dentetsu Toyama Station, next to the main JR Toyama Station, is served by the following lines.
Toyama Chihō Railway
Main Line (Dentetsu-Toyama Station; next to JR Toyama Station)

Dentetsu Toyama station is the starting point of the Tateyama Kurobe Alpine Route to Murodō Station, Mount Tate, and Kurobe Dam. It is located directly next to the main Toyama Station, and has the local Toyama Chihō Railway Tateyama Line that goes through the towns of Funahashi, Kamiichi, and Tateyama, and ultimately reaches as far as Tateyama Station, the last stop.

Station layout
The station has a "Midori no Madoguchi" staffed ticket office.

Platforms
The departure melody used for the shinkansen platforms was composed by producer , who was born in Toyama Prefecture. The Hokuriku Shinkansen has 2 platforms serving 4 tracks, the Takayama Main Line/Ainokaze Toyama Railway Line has 2 platforms serving 5 tracks, the Toyama Chiho Railway Main Line at Dentetsu Toyama Station has 3 platforms serving 4 tracks, and the Toyama Light Rail at Toyamaeki has 3 platforms serving 2 tracks

Adjacent stations

History

Toyama Station opened on 20 March 1899. With the privatization of JNR on 1 April 1987, the station came under the control of JR West.

Surrounding area

Kitaguchi Entrance (north side)
 Canal Park

Minamiguchi Entrance (south side)
 Toyama Castle
 Museum of Modern Art, Toyama
 Toyama International Conference Center
 Koshino Bungakukan/Toyama Museum of Literature and Manga

See also
 List of railway stations in Japan
 Tateyama Station (Toyama)

References

External links

Toyama Station (JR West official page) 
Toyama Chiho Railway official website 
Toyama Light Rail official website 

Railway stations in Toyama Prefecture
Railway stations in Japan opened in 1899
Toyama (city)